Jenkins Creek is a stream in Barry County, Missouri. 
The stream source at the junction of the East and West forks is at coordinates:  just north of Leann and the confluence with Flat Creek is at:  just south of Jenkins.
 
Jenkins Creek bears the name of a pioneer settler.

See also
List of rivers of Missouri

References

Rivers of Barry County, Missouri
Rivers of Missouri